Chromacilla discoidalis  is a species of beetle in the family Cerambycidae.

Subspecies
 Chromacilla discoidalis discoidalis (Bates, 1879) 
 Chromacilla discoidalis equateurensis Juhel, 2010

Distribution
This species is present in Benin, Cameroon, Central African Republic, Democratic Republic of the Congo and Republic of the Congo.

References

Callichromatini
Beetles described in 1879